Asura roseogrisea is a moth of the family Erebidae. It is found in Burma.

References

roseogrisea
Moths described in 1913
Taxa named by Walter Rothschild
Moths of Asia